Camanchacas are marine stratocumulus cloud banks that form on the Chilean coast, by the Earth's driest desert, the Atacama Desert, and move inland. In Peru, a similar fog is called garúa, and in Angola cacimbo. On the side of the mountains where these cloud banks form, the camanchaca is a dense fog that does not produce rain. The moisture that makes up the cloud measure between 1 and 40 microns across, too fine to form rain droplets.

Fog collection 
In 1985, scientists devised a fog collection system of polyolefin netting to capture the water droplets in the fog to produce running water for villages in these otherwise desert areas. The Camanchacas Project installed 50 large fog-collecting nets on a mountain ridge, which capture some 2% of the water in the fog.

References

Stratus
Climate of Chile
Fog